Boopedon nubilum, known generally as ebony grasshopper, is a species of slant-faced grasshopper in the family Acrididae. Other common names include the black-males grasshopper and plains boopie. It is found in Central America and North America.

Subspecies
These two subspecies belong to the species Boopedon nubilum:
 Boopedon nubilum maculatum Caudell, 1916
 Boopedon nubilum nubilum (Say, 1825)

References

Further reading

External links

 

Gomphocerinae
Articles created by Qbugbot
Insects described in 1825